Baden Powelllaan 12 is an old house (Heerenhuis) in Het Park, Rotterdam, built circa 1760. Found near the Euromast it was the main building of the De Heuvel estate. From 1875 this villa forms part of the Park. The mansion reflects the late 18th century Dutch grandeur It is classified as a Rijksmonument (number: 32733).

References

Rijksmonuments in Rotterdam